Operation Firewood was a secretive military operation in 1987 by the South African Defence Force (SADF) during the South African Border War.

Background
The PLAN Northern Command base was 35 km north of the town of Techamutete, Angola at a place called Indungo. A SADF battle group was formed and consisted of elements of 1 Parachute Battalion, 5 Reconnaissance Regiment, 2 Reconnaissance Regiment and 101 Battalion. This battle group would be a mechanised force and consisted of Ratels, Casspirs and Buffels.

Order of battle

South African and South West Africa Territorial Forces
 101 Battalion
 elements - 1 Parachute Battalion
 elements - 5 Reconnaissance Regiment
 elements - 2 Reconnaissance Regiment

Battle
The attack occurred on 31 October 1987. The PLAN base, set in a densely wooded area, was attacked from the west by special forces ("recce's") and paratroopers ("Parabats") of the SADF, while 101 Battalion covered the base from north, east and south, the direction PLAN forces were expected to flee. The fighting was said to be intense lasting seven hours with PLAN putting up a fight against the SADF. The base was not successfully taken by the SADF forces, who withdrew when PLAN reinforcements were understood to be on their way.

Aftermath
The South African forces are said to have incurred 12 killed and 47 wounded, while other sources say it was as high as 19 killed and 64 wounded. On the SWAPO side, the casualties were said to be high too with at least 150 PLAN soldiers killed. Honoris Crux medals were awarded to five 101 Battalion members for gallantry in action.

References

Further reading
 
 

Conflicts in 1987
Military history of Angola
Cross-border operations of South Africa
Battles and operations of the South African Border War
Operations involving South African special forces
1987 in Angola
1987 in South Africa
October 1987 events in Africa